John Thomas Palethorpe (23 November 1909 – 6 June 1984) was an English professional footballer who played for Reading, Stoke City, Preston North End, Sheffield Wednesday, Aston Villa and Crystal Palace. He was a tall centre forward who scored 106 League goals (113 including FA Cup) in a career which lasted from 1929 to 1938, making 177 League appearances (197 including FA Cup).

Playing career

Early days
Palethorpe was born in Leicester on 23 November 1909 he trained to be a shoemaker before concentrating on football. He played non-League football for Maidenhead United in the Spartan League in the 1929–30 season, scoring a club record 65 goals in 39 appearances in his only full season at York Road, including seven in one match against Wood Green Town.

Reading
He signed professionally for Reading for the following term and had two good full seasons at Elm Park scoring 54 goals in 59 League appearances. In March 1932 Jack scored a hat-trick in just seven minutes as Reading beat Mansfield Town 7–1. This was a record until Trevor Senior scored three goals in four minutes 50 years later. Jack helped Reading finish runners up in Division Three South in the 1931-32 campaign.

Stoke City and Preston North End
Towards the end of the 1932–33 season Palethorpe transferred to Stoke City and his eight goals in 10 matches helped them win the Second Division championship and promotion to the First Division. Palethorpe's first taste of top flight football the following season only lasted for 11 games as he switched to Second Division leaders Preston North End who hoped he would do a similar job to what he did at Stoke and guarantee promotion. Palethorpe formed a fine goalscoring partnership with George Stephenson ensuring that Preston gained promotion as runners-up. However the following season he lost his place to Bud Maxwell and in December 1934 he joined Sheffield Wednesday for a fee of £3,100.

Sheffield Wednesday
Palethorpe gained an immediate place in the Wednesday first team, somewhat controversially replacing the popular Neil Dewar as Wednesday's centre forward. He made his debut on 15 December 1934 against Everton and scored his first goals on Boxing Day, a hat-trick against Birmingham City. In the second half of that season Palethorpe played an integral part in Sheffield Wednesday's excellent run and eventual triumph in the FA Cup of that season scoring goals in the third and fourth rounds as well as one in the semi-final win over Burnley at Villa Park. However his most important goal came in the 4–2 final triumph against West Bromwich Albion when he put Wednesday a goal up inside two minutes after receiving a pass from Ronnie Starling and shooting just inside the post. Despite a good record of 17 goals in 34 matches in all competitions, Palethorpe was once again on his way to another club in September 1935 as he joined Aston Villa for £2,500.

Latter career
Palethorpe was still only 25 when he joined Villa but his career seemed to be on a slippery slope, he played only six games in thirteen months at Villa as they were relegated from Division One in the 1935–36 season. In October 1936 he moved, this time to Third Division Crystal Palace for whom he scored 11 goals in 39 league matches. In 1938 he moved into non-league football again, playing for Chelmsford City, Shorts Sports and Colchester United. He effectively retired from playing in 1939 although he did make some appearances for Colchester in the Wartime Leagues. He later did some coaching at North Town and back at his first club Maidenhead.

Throughout his career, Jack Palethorpe had a reputation for never staying at a football club for any length of time, his longest stint at any one club was two seasons and 59 league appearances at Reading. He had the unusual record of playing for four different First Division clubs (Stoke, Preston, Sheffield Wednesday and Aston Villa) but never actually completing a full season with any one of them. His nickname throughout his career was "SOS" and this may have something to with the Palethorpe Sausage company which he may or may not have been associated with. He had the reputation of having a very good sense of humour and was known as the dressing room comedian. After leaving football he worked for the Fairey Aviation Company. Jack Palethorpe died on 6 June 1984 in Slough aged 74.

Career statistics
Source:

Honours
Stoke City
Second Division Champions, 1932–33

Sheffield Wednesday
FA Cup winner: 1935
Charity Shield winner 1935

References

1909 births
1984 deaths
Footballers from Leicester
English footballers
Association football forwards
Maidenhead United F.C. players
Reading F.C. players
Stoke City F.C. players
Preston North End F.C. players
Sheffield Wednesday F.C. players
Aston Villa F.C. players
Crystal Palace F.C. players
Chelmsford City F.C. players
Shorts Sports F.C. players
Colchester United F.C. players
English Football League players
FA Cup Final players
Association football coaches